The Human Studies Film Archives (HSFA), part of the Smithsonian's National Museum of Natural History, is devoted to preserving, documenting and providing access to anthropological moving image materials. It is located at the Smithsonian Museum Support Center in Suitland, Maryland.

History
The Archives officially began its mission in 1975 when, as the National Anthropological Film Center (NAFC), it initiated a program that both created and collected films of anthropological research interest. The NAFC was founded through the advocacy of a group of anthropologists and filmmakers, including Margaret Mead, John Marshall, Timothy Asch, and Jay Ruby. As director of the NAFC, E. Richard Sorenson promoted anthropological film as a scientific research tool. The center received funding from the National Endowment for the Humanities and the National Institutes of Health. In 1981, the NAFC was renamed the Human Studies Film Archives and became part of the Department of Anthropology at the National Museum of Natural History. Today, HSFA collections and resources support research on specific cultures, the development of ethnographic film, and the broad study of visual culture.  The Archives also promotes the importance of moving images as an integral part of the anthropological record.

Collections
HSFA collections comprise more than 7 million feet of film and almost one thousand hours of video recordings.  These visual research resources, along with related documentary material encompass a broad range of documentary, travelogue, ethnographic and amateur genres dating from 1908 to the present. Associated collections include more than 250,000 photographs, fieldnotes and shot logs and field audio recordings. The HSFA holds several major ethnographic film collections, including: the John Marshall's films of the Ju/'hoan Bushmen (!Kung); Timothy Asch and Napoleon Chagnon's films of the Yanomami of Brazil; the work of Jorge Preloran; and films by David and Judith MacDougall.

See also
National Anthropological Archives

External links
National Anthropological Archives and Human Studies Film Archives on the Anthropology Collections and Archives page at the National Museum of Natural History
HSFA Guide to Collections
National Film Preservation Foundation
SIRIS, Smithsonian online catalog

References

Film archives in the United States
Smithsonian Institution museums
1975 establishments in the United States